Paul Shooner (born May 2, 1923) is a Canadian former provincial politician. He was the Union Nationale member of the Legislative Assembly of Quebec for Yamaska from 1966 to 1970. As of June 2020, Shooner lives in Pierreville, Quebec and still takes daily walks in his town to stay active.

References

1923 births
Living people
People from Centre-du-Québec
Union Nationale (Quebec) MNAs